was a Japanese voice actor.

Filmography

Television animation
Aoki Ryusei SPT Layzner
Ashita no Joe 2 as Harimau
Cat's Eye as Variety
City Hunter: Goodbye my Sweetheart as Gen
Code Geass: Lelouch of the Rebellion as General Cao (ep 20); Rear vassal (ep 6)
Eternal Family as Drunkard A
Ganso Tensai Bakabon
Gatchaman as Variety
GUNxSWORD as Carlos
Gyakuten Ippatsu-man
Hurricane Polymar
Itadakiman
Kagaku Ninja-Tai Gatchaman II
Kashi no Ki Mokku
Kerokko Demetan
Lupin III: Part II as Sergio (ep 50, 51); Rasuputan (ep 97)
Mobile Suit Gundam Wing as Professor H
Pokémon as Tarō's father (ep 34)
Sherlock Hound as 
Shinzo Ningen Casshan
Space Adventure Cobra as Ron Clark
Time Bokan as Court president (ep 3)
Uchuu no Kishi Tekkaman as Variety
Warau Salesman
Yoroshiku Mechadock

Original video animation (OVA)
 Bewitching Nozomi as Yamazaki-kaichou (volume 2, 3)
 Mobile Suit Gundam 0083: Stardust Memory as Gaily
 Mobile Suit Gundam Wing: Endless Waltz as Professor H

Theatrical animation
 Doraemon: Nobita at the Birth of Japan as Landlord
 Doraemon: Nobita's Wannyan Space-Time Odyssey as Fish Government
 Gundam Wing Endless Waltz Special Edition as Instructor H
 Kiki's Delivery Service as Man with deck brush
 Mobile Suit Gundam F91 as Rohbar
 Sword for Truth as Ubito

Dubbing
The Fighter, George Ward (Jack McGee)

References

External links 
 
 Takashi Taguchi at Production baobab (Japanese)

1942 births
Japanese male voice actors
Male actors from Tokyo
2016 deaths